Front Page Detective is an American crime drama series which aired on the DuMont Television Network  on Fridays at 9:30 p.m. ET from July 6, 1951, to September 19, 1952, and in October and November 1953. The program was then in broadcast syndication for several years thereafter.

Synopsis
Front Page Detective stars Edmund Lowe as David Chase, a newspaper columnist who helps police solve especially difficult mysteries. The title derived from a popular true-crime magazine of the same name, and stories were based on material from the magazine.

Other cast members were Frank Jenks as Lieutenant Rodney, Paula Drew as Sharon Richards, and George Pembroke as Lieutenant Andrews.

Personnel 
Jerry Fairbanks was the producer and distributor, and Arnold Wester was the director. Gene Levitt and Robert Mitcher were the writers.

Reception
A review in The New York Times of the series's initial episode found that its drama paled in comparison to that of the Kefauver Commission hearings that were then being televised. The reviewer suggested that the killer was fairly obvious and described the episode as "too cut and dried ...". A review in the trade publication Variety panned the June 27, 1952, episode, describing it as "a dull affair which the actors seemed to realize and refuse to help". The review also noted "slipshod and oftimes embarrassing" off-camera operations.

Episode status
UCLA Film and Television Archive has 17 episodes of this series. Internet Archive and TV4U also have one episode each.

Unlike many other programs which aired on DuMont, the series was produced on film by an outside production company. A few episodes are available on DVD and online, usually as part of early TV compilations.

See also
List of programs broadcast by the DuMont Television Network
List of surviving DuMont Television Network broadcasts
1951-52 United States network television schedule

Bibliography
David Weinstein, The Forgotten Network: DuMont and the Birth of American Television (Philadelphia: Temple University Press, 2004) 
Alex McNeil, Total Television, Fourth edition (New York: Penguin Books, 1980) 
Tim Brooks and Earle Marsh, The Complete Directory to Prime Time Network TV Shows, Third edition (New York: Ballantine Books, 1964)

References

External links
 
List of episodes at CTVA
DuMont historical website

DuMont Television Network original programming
Black-and-white American television shows
1951 American television series debuts
1953 American television series endings
1950s American crime drama television series
English-language television shows
Television series about journalism